Knockomagh Wood is a national nature reserve of approximately  located in County Cork, Ireland. It is managed by the National Parks and Wildlife Service.

History
Knockomagh Wood was legally protected as a national nature reserve by the Irish government in 1989.

The area was damaged during Hurricane Ophelia in 2017, which led to the wood being closed for a period of time.

Features 
The wood is a small area of sessile oak and mixed broadleaf trees. There are a number of walks in the area, around Lough Hyne and up Knockomagh Hill. Coillte own and manage the conifer trees above Knockomagh Wood on the slopes of the Hill.

References

Geography of County Cork
Forests and woodlands of the Republic of Ireland
Nature reserves in the Republic of Ireland
Tourist attractions in County Cork